Richard Vernon Huffman (December 18, 1914 – March 18, 1995) was an American football and basketball player.  He was born in Mooreland, Indiana and was raised in and around New Castle, Indiana.

He played basketball for the New Castle High School team that won the Indiana state basketball championship in 1932.  He enrolled at Indiana University in 1932 and played both football and basketball there.  He was an All-American in both basketball and football at Indiana and won the 1936 Chicago Tribune Silver Football as the best football player in the Big Ten Conference.

He played two seasons of professional football in the National Football League for the Detroit Lions in 1937 and 1938.  Huffman later managed a dairy and worked for the Federal Bureau of Investigation.  He was inducted into the Indiana Hoosiers Hall of Fame in 1982.  Huffman died in 1995 at age 80 in Bloomington, Indiana.

Huffman's brother Marv was also an All-American basketball player at Indiana and later played professionally with the Akron Goodyear Wingfoots of the National Basketball League.

References

1914 births
1995 deaths
All-American college men's basketball players
American football halfbacks
American football quarterbacks
American men's basketball players
Basketball players from Indiana
Detroit Lions players
Indiana Hoosiers football players
Indiana Hoosiers men's basketball players
Indianapolis Kautskys players
New Castle Chrysler High School alumni
People from New Castle, Indiana
Players of American football from Indiana